48May is a New Zealand pop rock group. The band consists of Jon Austin (vocals, guitar), CaptainHook (guitar, vocals), Stan Bicknell (drums, vocals) and Shannon Brown (bass, vocals). Hook and Jon went to Hamilton Boys' High School together, while Stowers in the year above, was the lead singer in the band The Grinners (previously called Lyon), while Shannon Brown is well known on the New Zealand music circuit for his roles in bands such as Tadpole.

The name "48May" came from their residence during university; at 48 May Street in Hamilton. They have achieved success within New Zealand including a place on the New Zealand leg of the 2005 Big Day Out and Edgefest05 tour, their first record (The Mad Love) going Gold in NZ, and their second record (Streetlights and Shadows) being released in Japan by Triple Vision followed by 48May touring through Japan with Four Year Strong and Every Avenue in support of the release. They have also performed as support act for Alien Ant Farm, Simple Plan, Panic! at the Disco, and Steriogram, among others.

48May have since split due to all members going their separate ways. Jon is now working in advertising in Sydney, married with a son, CaptainHook was Head Engineer at York Street Studio in Auckland before moving to Melbourne to be Product Manager of Imaging Technology at Blackmagic Design, Stan is living in Tauranga, and in 2010, Shannon studied at the University of Waikato, school of education, majoring in English and Theatre Studies. Shannon began a teaching career at Hamilton Boys' High School as head of drama in 2013. He is now the senior curriculum leader of drama at Rototuna High School.

Band members
 Jon Austin a.k.a. Jonathan Austin Ho (vocals, guitar)  (2004–2008)
 CaptainHook a.k.a. Hook Stowers (guitar, vocals)  (2004–2008)
 Shannon Brown a.k.a. Adam Shannon Brown (bass, vocals)  (2004–2008)
 Stan Bicknell a.k.a. Daniel Bicknell (drums, vocals)  (2007–2008)
 Jarod Brown a.k.a. Daniel Jarod Brown (vocals, drums)  (2004–2007)

Discography

Albums

Singles

Awards

Juice TV Music Awards
Best Indie Video ("Fightback") 2003
Song of the Year ("Home by 2"): 2005
ZM People's Choice Video ("Come Back Down") 2004
Telecom Top Video ("Car Crash Weather") 2008

References

External links
captainhook.co.nz
48May | Listen and Stream Free Music, Albums, New Releases, Photos, Videos
Stan Bicknell | Drummer | Musician
York Street Studio - New Zealand's premier recording studio

New Zealand punk rock groups
Musical groups established in 2004